Jude Thadaeus Ruwa'ichi, O.F.M. Cap. (born 30 January 1954) is a Tanzanian prelate of the Catholic Church who has been Archbishop of Dar-es-Salam since 15 August 2019. He is a Capuchin and has been a bishop since 1998.

Biography 
Jude Thadaeus Ruwa'ichi was born on 30 December 1954 in Mulo-Kilema, in the Diocese of Moshi, Tanzania.

He joined the Capuchins and was ordained a priest on 25 November 1981. He has served as a member of the order's governing body (General Definitorium).

Pope John Paul II appointed him Bishop of Mbulu on 9 February 1999. He received his episcopal consecration from Archbishop Polycarp Pengo on 16 May. Pope John Paul appointed him Archbishop of Dodoma on 15 January 2005.

On 10 November 2010, Pope Benedict XVI appointed him Archbishop of Mwanza. In 2014, he participated in the launch of a program for the prevention and treatment HIV combined with efforts to prevent discrimination against people living with HIV. The program was based on a partnership with government agencies with NGO funding. He also served as Apostolic Administrator of the Diocese of Shinyanga from 2013 to 2015.

Pope Francis appointed him Archbishop Coadjutor of Dar es Salaam on 21 June 2018. Ruwa'ichi became Archbishop upon the retirement of Cardinal Polycarp Pengo on 15 August 2019. In March 2019, while announcing a partnership with private insurers to provide life insurance as they had health insurance, he challenged them to address education insurance to allow families to finance education with less dependence on sponsors and patrons.

He was President of the Tanzania Episcopal Conference from 2006 to 2012. He has been an advocate of the Small Christian Communities movement.

He is the author of The Constitution of Muntu: an inquiry into the eastern Bantuʼs metaphysics of person (Berne: Peter Lang, 1990; European University Studies).

References

External links 
 Catholic Hierarchy: Archbishop Jude Thadaeus Ruwa’ichi, O.F.M. Cap. 

Tanzanian Roman Catholic archbishops
Capuchins
1954 births
Living people
People from Kilimanjaro Region
Roman Catholic archbishops of Dar-es-Salaam